Cyrtocris fulvicornis is a species of beetle in the family Cerambycidae, and the only species in the genus Cyrtocris. It was described by Sven Magnus Aurivillius in 1904. It is known from Lukuledi River in Tanzania.

References

Theocridini
Beetles described in 1904
Endemic fauna of Tanzania
Taxa named by Sven Magnus Aurivillius